Nidagal is a village in Belgaum district of Karnataka, India.

Famous for Siddeshwar temple. It lies in between Khanapur and Gurl Gunji.

References

Villages in Belagavi district